Emil Köpplinger (19 December 1897 – 29 July 1988) was a German international footballer.

References

1897 births
1988 deaths
Association football midfielders
German footballers
Germany international footballers
1. FC Nürnberg players